Baujan Field is a soccer-specific stadium located in Dayton, Ohio on the University of Dayton campus. Its main tenants are the Dayton Flyers men's and women's soccer teams.  

It was originally built in 1925 as UD's main athletic field, and was named in honor of longtime head football coach Harry Baujan in 1961.  After the football team moved to Welcome Stadium in 1974, the concrete grandstand was torn down, and it was retrofitted for soccer.  Bleachers were the only seats available from then until 2000, when a terraced seating section was carved into the hillside.

References

College soccer venues in the United States
Dayton Flyers soccer
Soccer venues in Ohio
Sports venues in Dayton, Ohio
Defunct college football venues
1925 establishments in Ohio
Sports venues completed in 1925